Titus (died 272) was Bishop of Byzantium from 242 to 272.

272 deaths
Year of birth unknown
Bishops of Byzantium
3rd-century Romans